Crassula ovata, commonly known as jade plant, lucky plant, money plant or money tree, is a succulent plant with small pink or white flowers that is native to the KwaZulu-Natal and Eastern Cape provinces of South Africa, and Mozambique; it is common as a houseplant worldwide. Much of its popularity stems from the low levels of care needed; the jade plant requires little water and can survive in most indoor conditions. It is sometimes referred to as the money tree; however, Pachira aquatica also has this nickname.

Description 

The jade plant is an evergreen with thick branches. It has thick, shiny, smooth leaves that grow in opposing pairs along the branches. Leaves are a rich jade green, although some may appear to be more of a yellow-green. Some varieties may develop a red tinge on the edges of leaves when exposed to high levels of sunlight. New stem growth is the same colour and texture as the leaves, becoming woody and brown with age.

It grows as an upright, rounded, thick-stemmed, strongly branched shrub and reaches stature heights of up to 2.5 metres. The base is usually sparsely branched. Sometimes a single main trunk of up to 9 centimetres in diameter is formed. The succulent shoots are gray-green. The bark of older branches peels off in horizontal, brownish stripes. Although becoming brown and appearing woody with age, stems never become true lignified tissue, remaining succulent and fleshy throughout the plant's life.

The oppositely arranged, ascending to spreading, green leaves are stalked with up to 5 millimetres short. The fleshy, bare, obovate, wedge-shaped leaf blade is 3 to 9 centimetres long and 1.8 to 4 centimetres wide. The sharp-edged leaf margins are often reddish.

Numerous varieties and cultivars have been selected, of which C. ovata 'Hummel's Sunset' has gained the Royal Horticultural Society's Award of Garden Merit.

Inflorescence
When it matures, it produces small white or pink, star-like shaped flowers in winter. The terminal inflorescence is a top round thyrsus with numerous dichasia. It has a length and a diameter of about 5 centimetres. The inflorescence stem has a length of 15 to 18 millimetres and a diameter of 2 millimetres. The flower stalks are 5 millimetres long.

The sweet-scented, hermaphroditic flowers have radial symmetry and double perianths. The five sepals, each about 2 millimetres long, are fused to one another at the base. The pink or white flower crown is star-shaped and has a diameter of about 15 millimetres. Its lanceolate petals are 7 millimetres long and 2.5 millimetres wide. The stamens have a length of 5 millimetres. The combination of shorter days, cold nights and lack of water for several weeks will produce flowering around the beginning of winter.

Cultivation 

As a succulent, Crassula ovata requires little water in the summer and even less in the winter. It is susceptible to overwatering, especially during the cold season. Watering excessively can cause leaf fall and root rot. However, a lack of water can also damage it. It should be grown in a porous substrate with good drainage, which will vary depending on the climate it is grown in. It requires about 4–6 hours of direct sun or medium shade exposures with bright light. In regions of mild weather it can withstand some light frost, provided that the substrate is kept dry.

C. ovata may display a red tinge around its leaves when grown with bright sunlight. In more extreme cases, the green colour of the plant is lost and can be replaced by yellow. This is caused by the jade plant making pigments such as carotenoids to protect from harsh sunlight and ultraviolet rays. The plant also flowers in the wintertime, particularly during a cooler, darker, dry spell. C. ovata is sometimes attacked by mealybugs, a common nuisance of the succulents.

Propagation 
The jade plant is also known for its ease of propagation, which can be carried out with clippings or even stray leaves which fall from the plant. Jade plants may readily be propagated from both with success rates higher than with cuttings. In the wild, vegetative propagation is the jade plant's main method of reproduction. Branches regularly fall off wild jade plants, and these branches may root and form new plants.

Like many succulents, jade plants can be propagated from just the swollen leaves which grow in pairs on the stems. While propagation methods may vary, most follow similar steps. Typically, the wounds on the leaves are left to dry and callus over. Then, the leaves are placed in or on soil. Roots begin to grow on severed leaves about four weeks after being removed from the stem. Environmental factors such as temperature and humidity affect the speed at which the roots and new plants develop. Foliage usually appears soon after new roots have formed.

Parasites and diseases
Scale insects are common pests of Crassula ovata and can cause deformation of the plant during growth. An infestation can be eliminated by killing each insect with a cotton bud or brush that has been soaked in rubbing alcohol. This process is repeated daily until all mealybugs have been killed, as well as new insects that may still hatch after the mealybugs living on the plant have been killed. Aphids are also common pests, but they tend to infest the stems of flowers. Spider mites can also cause problems. Exposure to sap or leaves can cause dermatitis in humans.

Toxicity
Like many species from the Crassulaceae family, the jade plant is toxic to horses, and dogs and cats, as well as mildly toxic to humans, in some cases, with skin contact. In this respect it differs greatly, possibly dangerously, from Portulacaria, which is edible to humans and other animals.

Cultivars
 'Crosby's Compact' (syn. 'Crosby's Dwarf', 'Crosby's Red', 'Red Dwarf Jade Plant') -The variety has smaller leaves that are usually red in color. The branches are also smaller than that of other varieties, giving the impression that it is miniature. 
 'Monstruosa' (syn. The flowers are small and star-like, white or pinkish-white in colour. Resembling a small tree, its trunk becomes thick with age. They grow in well-drained, regularly watered soils in bright airy conditions under a few hours of sunshine in a day, as well as in part shade. They have a superficial resemblance to Sedum rubrotinctum. They are colloquially known as spoon jade, hobbit jade, Gollum jade, ET’s fingers, finger jade, trumpet jade, and ogre ears.
 'Tricolor' – A slow-growing branching shrub with stout stems that has round, variegated bright green leaves which are creamy yellow and white in colour. Drought-tolerant, it still relies on occasional water in summer but virtually none in winter (unless grown in container). This variety can also be referred to as Crassula Ovata ‘Lemon & Lime’.
 'Undulata' – A variety with curly leaves.

AGM cultivars
The following have gained the Royal Horticultural Society's Award of Garden Merit:-
Crassula ovata
'Gollum'
'Hummel's Sunset'

Gallery

See also
Crassula arborescens
Kleinia petraea, an unrelated similar looking trailing plant

References

External links

 Crassula ovata at succulent-plant.com

ovata
Flora of Mozambique
Flora of the Cape Provinces
Flora of KwaZulu-Natal
Albany thickets
Garden plants
House plants
Plants used in bonsai